N. Santhanam is an Indian actor and producer who mainly works in Tamil cinema. Beginning his career as a comedian on television, he rose to fame through his performances in STAR Vijay's Lollu Sabha enacting the lead role in spoofs of Tamil films. He was subsequently given a chance by actor Silambarasan to feature in a supporting role in Manmadhan (2004) and then was signed on to appear in a host of films, notably winning good reviews for his work in Sachien (2005) and Polladhavan (2007). He appeared in a one-off leading role in Shankar's production Arai En 305-il Kadavul (2008) and became a staple feature as a comedian in successful Tamil films during the period, with his market popularity helping stuck films find distributors.

Santhanam has also had embarked on collaborations with directors including gaining positive reviews for his work in M. Rajesh's comic trilogy of Siva Manasula Sakthi (2009), Boss Engira Bhaskaran (2010) and Oru Kal Oru Kannadi (2012), winning the Vijay Award for Best Comedian for each one. He has also repeatedly collaborated in the films of A. L. Vijay, Siva and Sundar C. as well.

His consistently well-received performances and box office appeal in the early 2010s prompted the film industry to dub him as the "Comedy Superstar". In 2012, he began a film production company named Handmade Films and produced his first film, Kanna Laddu Thinna Aasaiya (2013), which went on to become a commercially successful venture. Meanwhile, in 2014, he starred in the leading role for the second time in the action comedy Vallavanukku Pullum Aayudham.

Career
Unlike comedians such as Vadivelu and Vivek who usually appear in comedy tracks separate from the main plot, Santhanam mostly plays either the male protagonist's friend or enemy, forming an essential part of the plot. He has noted that he actively avoided being a part of separate comedy tracks within films, maintaining that appearing as an actor in the story would stop his comedy from becoming monotonous.

His appeal at the box office was evident after films such as Leelai and  Kadhal Pisase were able to find distributors following long delays, while Telugu film-makers S S Rajamouli and Sai Kiran Adivi partially shot scenes with the actor before releasing a Tamil version of their Telugu films, through Naan Ee and Vinayaga.

Santhanam's first production venture, Kanna Laddu Thinna Aasaiya directed by Manikandan, became a commercially successful venture upon release in January 2013. Producing the venture under his newly formed studio Handmade Films, Santhanam opted to introduce a predominantly new cast and keep a low budget for the project understanding that film production had "previously ended the careers of many". Featuring Santhanam as one of the three lead characters alongside his close friend and dermatologist Sethu and Power Star Srinivasan, the film was well received by critics, with a reviewer noting "there is a serious actor hidden somewhere inside Santhanam, who seems to be waiting for the right opportunity or role to break out of the comedian and sidekick roles he is confined to now", adding that "he can put many commercially successful actors to shame". He featured a journalist in Kannan's comedy film Settai alongside Arya and Premgi Amaren, also serving as an assistant director, while he then also played a popular role of a love guru in Sundar C's Theeya Velai Seiyyanum Kumaru. He continued to feature in well received roles in commercially successful films like Raja Rani and Vanakkam Chennai, and his work in Endrendrum Punnagai with Jiiva and Vinay, was also praised with a critic noting that "with his spot-on comedy, measured histrionics and his immense likeability, he is a revelation and provides some hearty laughs". A set-back came in the form of his fourth collaboration with Rajesh in All in All Azhagu Raja which became a surprise failure, and a critic wrote "though he does have his moments, the comedy seems to be forced, many of the scenes greatly exaggerated, and his portrayal of Kareena Chopra is a disaster".

In 2014, he appeared in the leading role in Srinath's Vallavanukku Pullum Aayudham, a remake of the 2010 Telugu film Maryada Ramanna. In preparation for the film, Santhanam lost weight, sported a different look and attended dance classes as well as reducing his work by being more selective on accepting other scripts. The film opened in May 2014 to positive reviews and box office success with a critic noting that "it is a Santhanam show all the way" and that "he also delivers as a complete actor, displaying a range of emotions". He told in an interview that he is not interested in playing supporting roles (comedian) anymore  He’s continued to play lead roles in films like Inimey Ippadithaan (2015) and Dhilluku Dhuddu (2016) and Sakka Podu Podu Raja (2017). The actor has become conscious about his looks and is constantly working on it.

He starring in Dhilluku Dhuddu 2 (2019) is the sequel to Dhilluku Dhuddu. Santhanam's brand of comedy is 'giving counters' or mocking heroes, villains and everyone in the film something that Goundamani used to do. His film, A1 (2019) was a saving grace but the actor is back to his routine with Dagaalty (2020). Santhanam outperforms himself in choosing one bad film after another. His brand of comedy, expressions and body language have become repetitive. In Kannan’s Biskoth (2020), Santhanam plays a person who works in a biscuit factory. But what we recently discovered is that the actor also appears as a king in a portion of the film, set in the 18th century. In Parris Jeyaraj (2021), Santhanam is a YouTuber who is famous among youngsters for his gaana songs. Next in Dikkiloona (2021), a science fiction comedy film written and directed by Karthik Yogi. In Agent Kannayiram (2022), Santhanam played the role of a self-proclaimed, private detective who tries to solve the mystery behind the unsolved dead bodies found in and around the railway tracks.

Personal life
Santhanam grew up in Pozhichalur, near Pallavaram in Chennai. Santhanam married Usha in 2004. It was an arranged marriage by their parents. They have three children. He is very close to Silambarasan, who gave him his first movie breakthrough, and considers him his godfather.

Controversies
Santhanam was involved in controversy after he performed an impersonation of Mukesh Harane, a 24-year-old tobacco user who died of oral cancer and featured in health-risk warning cards before films in India, in the film All in All Azhagu Raja. In 2013, a dialogue laced with double entendres uttered by him in Endrendrum Punnagai created controversy. He was accused of making remarks against women; due to protests, the dialogue was removed from the film. Santhanam was booked for allegedly assaulting a Chennai-based builder who reportedly took a huge sum from Santhanam for a real estate deal. Santhanam's mockery of differently abled people in the film Dikkiloona has been met with harsh condemnation from various social activists. Santhanam's view on the film Jai Bhim earned him criticism. "Someone can make a film on Hinduism but they shouldn't say Christianity is inferior. Cinema is a medium that is catered to all sections of people and communities. To portray someone superior, let's not make others inferior", said Santhanam.He was called caste chauvinist by fans for taking this stance and his alleged relationship with chiefs of Pattali Makkal Katchi, Ramadoss and Anbumani Ramadoss.

Filmography

Lead roles

Television

Awards

References

External links

 
 
 

Indian male comedians
Indian male film actors
Indian Hindus
Tamil comedians
Tamil male actors
Indian Tamil people
Living people
Film producers from Chennai
Television personalities from Tamil Nadu
Male actors from Chennai
Place of birth missing (living people)
Indian male television actors
Tamil male television actors
21st-century Indian male actors
1980 births